John Keegan (1934–2012) was a British military historian.

John Keegan may also refer to:
John Keegan (footballer) (born 1981), English professional footballer
John Keegan (politician) (1867–1941), Australian trade unionist and politician
John Keegan (writer), Irish mythologist
John C. Keegan (born 1952), Retired American judge and politician from Arizona